Elizabeth Manners may refer to:
Elizabeth Cecil, 16th Baroness de Ros (c. 1574/75-1591), née Manners
Elizabeth Manners, née Lovell, wife of Thomas Manners, 1st Earl of Rutland from about 1512 to 1513